Géza Tordy (born 1 May 1938, Budapest) is a Hungarian actor.

Selected filmography
 Pillar of Salt (1958)
 Danger on the Danube (1961)
 Kárpáthy Zoltán (1966)
 A Handful of Heroes (1967)
 Szerelmi álmok – Liszt (1970)
 Stars of Eger (1968)
  (1983)
 The Red Countess (1985)
 A három testör Afrikában (1996)
 Perlasca, un Eroe Italiano (2002)

Bibliography
 Burns, Bryan. World Cinema: Hungary. Fairleigh Dickinson University Press, 1996.

External links

1938 births
Living people
Hungarian male film actors
Hungarian male television actors
Male actors from Budapest